Siah Gel-e Shah Abbas (also Romanized as Sīāh Gel-e Shāh ‘Abbās; also known as Sīāh Gel) is a village in Beyranvand-e Jonubi Rural District, Bayravand District, Khorramabad County, Lorestan Province, Iran. At the 2006 census, its population was 54, in 15 families.

References 

Towns and villages in Khorramabad County